The women's team sprint competition at the 2020 European Speed Skating Championships was held on 10 January 2020.

Results
The race was started at 21:25.

References

Women's team sprint